Franz Edmund Creffield, commonly known as Edmund Creffield and by the pseudonym Joshua (c. 1870–1906), was a German-American religious leader who founded a movement in Corvallis, Oregon, that became known locally as the "Holy Rollers". The movement, mainly popular among women, was widely regarded as a cult. Creffield, who believed himself the second coming of Jesus, had a number of run-ins with the authorities and the local citizenry over the next several years, often stemming from his relations with his female followers and his increasingly erratic behavior.

In 1906 Creffield was murdered by George Mitchell, whose sister was one of Creffield's followers. After being acquitted of wrongdoing in the killing, Mitchell was himself murdered by his sister in revenge, with another follower subsequent died by suicide. The story attracted national attention and was major news for a time in the Pacific Northwest.<ref name=Sutton>Robert P. Sutton, [https://archive.org/details/modernamericanco00robe/page/37 Modern American Communes]. Westport, CT: Greenwood Press, 2005; p. 37.</ref>

Early life
Franz Edmund Creffield was originally from Germany; it is unclear how he came to Oregon. He first appeared in Portland in 1903, and he quickly became involved in the Salvation Army. Later that year he was sent on mission to the town of Corvallis. Soon after, he broke with the Salvation Army and formed his own group, which he called the Bride of Christ Church. Townspeople regarded the church as a cult and called them "Holy Rollers" because they rolled on the floor for hours during their services.

Bride of Christ Church
Creffield did not say anything outrageous when he first came to Corvallis in 1903, preaching mostly about "the beauty of the full Gospel." Soon his followers believed he was receiving messages directly from God. Creffield preached for hours on end and his followers loudly rolled on the floor pleading for God's forgiveness. When their cacophonous meetings began running into the early morning hours, Creffield was barred from holding services within city limits.

During the summer he and his followers camped out on Kiger Island in the Willamette River. When the fall rains started Sarah Hurt and her three children, Maud, Frank, and Mae, some of his most ardent followers, invited him and about twenty others to move into their house just outside Corvallis. In October the group burned most of the house’s contents including furniture, utensils, heirlooms, a cat, and a dog. Reports that a baby had been sacrificed were false.

People soon began to ask if Creffield could really "live in the same locked house with a number of young girls, and do nothing in the world but be religious."

In January 1904, twenty vigilantes called the White Caps tarred and feathered Creffield, and told him to leave town and never come back. The next day Creffield and Maud Hurt were married in a room where "the odor of [pine] tar was noticeable."

In February Creffield was accused of having adulterous relations in Portland with Maud’s aunt, Donna Starr. Adultery was a criminal offense, so a warrant was put out for his arrest. A statewide manhunt went on for months. Meanwhile, many of his followers fasted and spent their days lying flat on the floor praying. Most were committed to either the Oregon State Insane Asylum or the Boys and Girls Aid Society in Portland.

In July, one month after Sarah Hurt was committed, Creffield was discovered nude and starving under her house. Creffield said he was innocent, but was found guilty and served seventeen months in the Oregon State Penitentiary. When released, he claimed he was Jesus Christ risen from the dead, his resurrection being his emergence from prison.

Creffield said he was responsible for the 1906 San Francisco earthquake and his followers, all of whom had been released from the asylum, believed him. "Creffield is Jesus Christ," Cora Hartley said. "He condemned the city of San Francisco and brought the earthquake; he has condemned the city of Corvallis and an earthquake will destroy this place." She and the others obeyed his order to evacuate to the coast.

Assassination

In April, Louis Hartley, a wealthy mine owner, followed his wife, Cora, and daughter, Sophie, when they went to Newport to meet up with Creffield and the others. As the group boarded a ferry, Hartley fired a revolver four times at Creffield. The gun snapped harmlessly because the centerfire cartridges were wrong for the rimfire gun.

Others were also gunning for Creffield, so he fled to Seattle with Maud. There, George Mitchell, Esther's brother, found him and, in front of witnesses, killed him.

Multnomah County’s district attorney, John Manning, sent King County’s prosecuting attorney, Kenneth Mackintosh, a letter saying, "I investigated many, many charges against him [Creffield] while he was on his Holy Rolling tour in Oregon, the character of which were perfectly awful, in so far as being low, degenerate and brutal, and if permitted, I would like an opportunity to testify before the grand jury, before Mitchell is indicted … I think the taking of the law in one’s own hands, under such circumstances, to mete out summary justice is almost excusable.". Mackintosh was appalled by Manning’s suggestion.

O.V. Hurt, Creffield's father-in-law, hired one of the best law firms in Seattle to defend George. Numerous witnesses testified to telling George that "free love" took place in 1903. They said they told George that Creffield preached that Christ would be reborn and one of the Brides of Christ would be the new Mary and that he needed to lay his hands upon them and purify them. They said they told George that mothers were debauched in front of their daughters, including Sarah and her then sixteen-year-old daughter, Mae. They said they told George that finally Creffield announced that the new Mary was Esther Mitchell, the then sixteen-year-old sister of George."

Many believe that much of the testimony was perjury, a tactic to avoid hearsay and put Creffield on trial. George was found not guilty by reason of insanity and released. Two days later, Esther shot and killed him using a gun Maud bought using their witness fees.

O.V. was devastated, but still loved his daughter so he hired the same lawyers who had defended George, to defend her. Before the case went to trial, Maud committed suicide. Esther was found not guilty by reason of insanity and committed to Western State Hospital, an asylum in Steilacoom, Washington.

Esther was released from the asylum in 1909. She died by suicide in  1914.

See also
 List of people who have claimed to be Jesus
 Messiah complex

Footnotes

Further reading

 Gerald J. Baldasty, Vigilante Newspapers: A Tale of Sex, Religion, and Murder in the Northwest. Seattle, WA: University of Washington Press, 2005.
 Linda Crew, Brides of Eden: A True Story Imagined. (Historical fiction.) New York: Harper Collins, 2001.
 Rosemary Gartner and Jim Phillips, "The Creffield-Mitchell Case, Seattle, 1906: The Unwritten Law in the Pacific Northwest," Pacific Northwest Quarterly, vol. 94, no. 2 (Spring, 2003), pp. 69–82. In JSTOR
 Theresa McCracken and Robert B. Blodgett, Holy Rollers: Murder and Madness in Oregon's Love Cult. Caldwell, ID: Caxton Press, 2002.
 Jim Phillips and Rosemary Gartner, Murdering Holiness: The Trials of Franz Creffield and George Mitchell. Vancouver, BC: UBC Press, 2003.
 Minerva Kiger Reynolds, Corvallis in 1900. Corvallis, OR: Minerva Kiger Reynolds, n.d. [1976].

External links
edmundcreffield.com
 Theresa McCracken, "Edmund Creffield and the Brides of Christ Church," The Oregon Encyclopedia,'' Oregon Historical Society.
 Seattle Holy Rollers Killings: The Spectacular End To An Oregon Love Cult from HistoryLink Washington state history
 WPA Historical Records of Benton County, OR

1870 births
1906 deaths
People from Corvallis, Oregon
History of Portland, Oregon
History of Seattle
History of San Francisco
Salvation Army officers
American murder victims
Prophets
Self-declared messiahs
Tarring and feathering in the United States
1906 murders in the United States
 German emigrants to the United States